The 1961–62 Volleyball Women's European Cup was the second edition of the competition for women's volleyball national champions in Europe. It was contested by ten teams, two less than the inaugural edition, and the quarterfinals and semifinals were replaced by a group stage. The competition was again won by the Soviet representative, as Burevestnik Odessa defeated Slavia Sofia in the final.

Preliminary round

Group stage

Final

References

European Cup
European Cup
CEV Women's Champions League